Danielle Roy Marinelli was the first mayor of Lévis, Quebec, elected in 2005 and reelected in 2009. She was also the last mayor of Saint-Jean-Chrysostome, Lévis, Quebec, serving from 1999 to 2001.

A native of Montmagny, Quebec, she was educated at the CEGEP at La Pocatière in nursing technology and became a nurse specializing in gerontology. She was working as a financial security consultant before entering politics. In 1991, she was elected to the municipal council for Saint-Jean-Chrysostome. She was president of the Société de transport de Lévis from 1999 to 2005. In 2000, she was vice-president of the Centre communautaire juridique de Québec.

Her grandfather Louis-O. Roy served as mayor of Montmagny and her cousin Claude Roy represented Montmagny-L'Islet in the Quebec assembly. She is married to Flavio Marinelli.

References 

French Quebecers
Living people
Mayors of Lévis, Quebec
People from Montmagny, Quebec
Year of birth missing (living people)
Women mayors of places in Quebec